Mausimaa Temple is an ancient shrine located in Kulada, a village also famous for its Bagh Devi temple, in Ganjam District of Odisha, India. The temple can be approached by road from Bhubaneswar (140 km) and Chhatrapur (102 km). The nearest railway station is at Berhampur (88 km). It is about 8 km from Bhanjanagar.

The presiding deity of the temple is Ardhasini, maternal aunt (or Mausi Maa) of Lord Jagannath.

The temple celebrates its festival during the Rath Yatra held in the Jagannath Temple (Puri). Upper Bagh Devi Temple and Ratneswar Mahadev temple are important shrines nearby.

External links
Temple Photos
Temple Details

Hindu temples in Ganjam district
Shakti temples